Stratiomyinae is a subfamily of flies in the family Stratiomyidae.

Genera
Tribe Oxycerini
Caloparyphus James, 1939
Euparyphus Gerstaecker, 1857
Oxycera Meigen, 1803
Oxycerina Rozkošný & Woodley, 2010
Vanoyia Villeneuve, 1908
Tribe Prosopochrysini
 Acanthasargus White, 1914
 Cyphoprosopa James, 1975
 Exochostoma Macquart, 1842
 Hoplistopsis James, 1950
 Melanochroa Brauer, 1882
 Myxosargus Brauer, 1882
 Nothomyia Loew, 1869
 Prosopochrysa Meijere, 1907
 Rhaphiocerina Lindner, 1936
Tribe Stratiomyini
Anoplodontha
Hedriodiscus
Hoplitimyia
Odontomyia Meigen, 1803
Oplodontha Rondani, 1863
Psellidotus
Stratiomys Geoffroy, 1762

References

Stratiomyidae
Diptera of Europe